Stewart Shapiro (born 1951) is O'Donnell Professor of Philosophy at the Ohio State University and distinguished visiting professor at the University of Connecticut.  He is a leading figure in the philosophy of mathematics where he defends the abstract variety of structuralism.

Education and career
Shapiro studied mathematics and philosophy at Case Western Reserve University in 1973. Then, he got his M.A. in mathematics at the State University of New York at Buffalo in 1975. He transferred to the University at Buffalo Philosophy Department, where three years later he received a Ph.D. His doctoral supervisor was John Corcoran.

He was elected a Fellow of the American Academy of Arts & Sciences in 2021.

Publications

Books 
 Philosophy of Mathematics: Structure and Ontology.  Oxford University Press, 1997.   
 Thinking about Mathematics: The Philosophy of Mathematics.  Oxford University Press, 2000.   
 Foundations without Foundationalism: A Case for Second-Order Logic.  Oxford University Press, 1991.  
 Vagueness in Context. Oxford University Press, 2006. 
 Varieties of Logic. Oxford University Press, 2014.

Editorships 
 Intensional Mathematics, Studies in Logic and the Foundations of Mathematics 113, Amsterdam, North Holland Publishing Company, 1985. Contributors: S. Shapiro, J. Myhill, N. D. Goodman, A. Scedrov, V. Lifschitz, R. Flagg, R. Smullyan.
 The Limits of Logic: Higher-Order Logic and the Löwenheim-Skolem Theorem, Routledge, 1996.
 Special issue of Philosophia Mathematica 4(2), devoted to structuralism. Contributors: P. Benacerraf, G. Hellman, B. Hale, C. Parsons, M. Resnik, S. Shapiro. Contributors: P. Benacerraf, G. Hellman, B. Hale, C. Parsons, M. Resnik, S. Shapiro, 1996.
 The Oxford Handbook of Philosophy of Mathematics and Logic. Oxford University Press, 2005.

See also
American philosophy
List of American philosophers

References

External links
 Stewart Shapiro's webpage at Ohio State University

1951 births
20th-century American philosophers
21st-century American philosophers
Case Western Reserve University alumni
Living people
Ohio State University faculty
Philosophers of mathematics
Structuralism (philosophy of mathematics)
University at Buffalo alumni